The Seventh Bandit is a 1926 American silent Western film featuring Harry Carey.

Plot

Cast
 Harry Carey
 James Morrison as Paul Scanlon
 Harriet Hammond as Dr. Shirley Chalmette
 John Webb Dillion as Jim Gresham
 Trilby Clark as Ann Drath
 Walter James as Ben Goring

See also
 Harry Carey filmography

External links
 

1926 films
American black-and-white films
1926 Western (genre) films
Films directed by Scott R. Dunlap
Pathé Exchange films
Silent American Western (genre) films
1920s American films
Films with screenplays by Richard Schayer
1920s English-language films